Točilovo is a village in the municipality of Tutin, Serbia. According to the 2002 census, the village had a population of 156.

References

Populated places in Raška District